Placedo is a census-designated place (CDP) in Victoria County, Texas, United States. This was a new CDP for the 2010 census with a population of 692.

It is part of the Victoria, Texas Metropolitan Statistical Area.

Geography
Placedo is located at  (28.691936, -96.825904). It is situated along U.S. Highway 87 in southeastern Victoria County, approximately 14 miles southeast of Victoria.

History
A settlement has existed at the site since the Republic of Texas era. The community is named for Plácido Benavides, a participant and organizer of volunteer troops in the Texas Revolution, and an early settler who established a ranch in the area during the 1830s. The San Antonio and Mexican Gulf Railroad established a station at Placedo in 1860. In 1906, the St. Louis, Brownsville and Mexico Railway crossed the old line and renamed the station Placedo Junction. Placedo was platted in 1910 and infrastructure improvements, including sidewalks and gutters, were added. By 1920, the community had a population of 300 with a bank, school, and several businesses. Much of the community was damaged during a 1925 hurricane and the population didn't begin to recover until the mid-1930s. In the following years, Placedo's population fluctuated from 400 in the 1940s to 220 in 1949, and rose to 480 by the mid-1960s and 515 a decade later. The number of inhabitants remained at that level until 2000, when an estimated 760 people were living in the community.

Placedo has a post office with the ZIP code 77977.

Education
Public education in the community of Placedo is provided by the Bloomington Independent School District.  The district has four schools, one of which is located in Placedo. Placedo Elementary School serves Bloomington ISD students in grades pre - kindergarten through first grade.

Notable residents
John Sharp, former Texas Comptroller of Public Accounts (1991-1999) and, since 2011, chancellor of the Texas A&M University System, is a native of Placedo.
Jesse Bernal, former University of California Regent (2008-2010), is a native of Placedo.
Josh Looman, lead game designer on the Madden video game franchise, is a native of Placedo.

References

External links

Unincorporated communities in Victoria County, Texas
Unincorporated communities in Texas
Victoria, Texas metropolitan area